Ian Kent (born 4 July 1961) is a Canadian para table tennis player. He is a double singles champion in the Para Pan-American Para Table Tennis Championships and has won six medals in Parapan American Games.

Biography
Kent was born in Welling in London then he moved to Canada with his parents as a young child, his mother is a former British track and field athlete. He holds a bachelor of science degree in mathematics and psychology from Saint Mary's University.

He has three sons, Isaac, Tyler and Matthew and two of them are one of Nova Scotia's top ranked table tennis players while Ian is still top ranked.

In 1999, Kent was aged 38, was diagnosed with dystonia and was bedridden for two years.

Sporting career
Kent first started playing competitively in 2004 when he played in the EuroChamp Table Tennis Tournament in Emmen, Netherlands. He only started winning medals in 2005 at the Para Pan-American Championships in Mar del Plata where he won a silver medal in the singles tournament and a bronze medal in the teams tournament with Martin Pelletier.

He has competed in the 2008 Summer Paralympics and also 2018 Commonwealth Games but did not advance to the final rounds in both tournaments.

References

External links
 
 

1961 births
Living people
Canadian people of English descent
Canadian male table tennis players
Paralympic table tennis players of Canada
Table tennis players at the 2008 Summer Paralympics
Table tennis players at the 2018 Commonwealth Games
Medalists at the 2007 Parapan American Games
Medalists at the 2011 Parapan American Games
Medalists at the 2015 Parapan American Games
Medalists at the 2019 Parapan American Games